Stanislav Gustavovich Strumilin (Strumillo-Petrashkevich) (29 January 1877, Dashkovtsy, Podolia Governorate – 25 January 1974, Moscow) was a Soviet economist and statistician. He played a leading role in the analysis of the planned economy of the Soviet type, including modeling, development of the five year plans and calculation of national income. His particular contributions include the "Strumilin index", a measure of labor productivity, and the "norm coefficient", relating to analysis of investment activity.

Biography 
Born into an impoverished noble family of Strumillo-Petrashkevich, descended from Marshal of the Grand Duchy of Lithuania Stanislav Petrashkovich Stromila. Strumilin joined the revolutionary movement in 1897 and joined the League of Struggle for the Emancipation of the Working Class. Strumilin became a member of the Russian Social Democratic Labour Party in 1899 and joined its Menshevik faction.

He graduated from Petrograd Polytechnical Institute in 1914.  After the October Revolution he worked on setting up the Soviet planned economy while he was appointed to a professorship in economics at the Moscow State University. 

Strumilin worked as the head of the Statistics Department of the Petrograd Regional Commissariat of Labor and from 1919 head of the statistics All-Union Central Council of Trade Unions. From 1921 to 1937  he worked at the State Planning Commission. In the 30s, he was deputy Chairman of the State Planning Committee and a member of its Presidium. From 1932 to 1934 he was deputy head of the Central Directorate of National Economic Accounting. From 1931 he was member of the Academy of Sciences of the Soviet Union.

Strumilin was also a professor at the Moscow State University, Plekhanov Institute of National Economy, Moscow State Economic Institute, Moscow Financial Institute and Academy of Social Sciences under the Central Committee of the CPSU.

In the sixties he gained an international reputation in the field of the economics of education following the publication of "The economics of education in the USSR" by UNESCO.

Works 
 "Bogatsvo i Trud" (Wealth and Labor) (1905)
 "Problemikiy Ekonomikiy Truda" (Problems of the Economics of Labor) (1925)
 "Otcherkiy Sovetskoy Ekonomikiy" (Essays on the Soviet Economy) (1928)
 "Promiyshlenniy Perevorot v Rossiy" (The Industrial Revolution in Russia) (1944)
 "The Time Factor in Capital Investment Projects" (published in 1946 in USSR, in 1951 published in English by International Economic Association)
 "Istoriya Chernoi Metalurgii v SSSR” (The history of metallurgical  industry in USSR) (1954)
 "The economics of education in the USSR" (1962)

References

External links 
 https://web.archive.org/web/20110615194812/http://econc10.bu.edu/economic_systems/Theory/Marxism/Soviet/strumilin.htm
 https://web.archive.org/web/20071026033537/http://cepa.newschool.edu/het/schools/soviet.htm
 
 https://web.archive.org/web/20070128182124/http://www.findarticles.com/p/articles/mi_m3955/is_n7_v47/ai_17792339
 

1877 births
1974 deaths
People from Vinnytsia Oblast
People from Litinsky Uyezd
Mensheviks
Marxian economists
Soviet economists
Full Members of the USSR Academy of Sciences
Heroes of Socialist Labour
Revolutionaries from the Russian Empire
Russian Social Democratic Labour Party members
Recipients of the Order of Lenin
Recipients of the Order of the Red Banner
Lenin Prize winners
Recipients of the USSR State Prize